Konopnica  is a village in Lublin County, Lublin Voivodeship, in eastern Poland. It is the seat of the gmina (administrative district) called Gmina Konopnica.

The village has a population of 740.

References

Villages in Lublin County